Kinky Boots is a 2005 British comedy-drama film directed by Julian Jarrold and written by Geoff Deane and Tim Firth. Nominated at the 64th Golden Globe Awards, it is based on a true story. The film tells of a struggling British shoe factory's young, straight-laced owner, Charlie, who forms an unlikely partnership with Lola, a drag queen, to save the business. Charlie develops a plan to produce custom footwear for drag queens, rather than the men's dress shoes that his firm is known for, alienating many in the process.

Plot
In Northampton, in the East Midlands of England, Charlie Price is attempting to save the family shoe factory, which has been floundering since his father died. While on a business trip to London to sell the company's extra stock, Charlie encounters a woman being harassed by drunken hoodlums and intervenes to his detriment. He wakes up backstage, in the dressing room of Lola, a drag queen performer and alter ego of Simon. Charlie is intrigued when he sees that drag queens' high heels snap easily, and wishes to create high heels that can support a greater range of foot sizes and body types. Back in Northampton, while in the process of laying off workers, one employee, Lauren, gives Charlie the idea of looking for a niche market product to save the business. Charlie then recruits Lauren to assist him in designing a high-heeled boot for drag performers.

When their initial designs are met with scorn by Lola, Charlie and Lauren bring her on as a consultant. The road is initially bumpy: many of the male employees are uncomfortable with Lola's presence and the new direction, and Charlie's relationship with his fiancée, Nicola, begins to deteriorate as she encourages him to sell the factory building to a developer. Although things improve when Lola tones down her personality and starts making friends, matters take a turn for the worse when Charlie is invited to showcase the new boots in Milan; the strain he puts on his employees causes most of them, including Lola, to walk out.

Charlie's fiancée arrives at the factory, furious that he took out a second mortgage on their house to save the company. Nicola insists that he sell the company, but Charlie is determined to save it and the jobs of his employees. The argument (which ends with Nicola leaving Charlie) is broadcast on the factory's PA system, which is overheard by Lauren and Lola's bitterest opponent at the factory, Don, a chauvinistic male worker. Don turns over a new leaf after Lola had graciously allowed him to win an arm wrestling match, and rallies the factory workers to make the boots in time for Charlie and Lauren to get to Milan. When Charlie catches Nicola with another man, he angrily takes out his frustrations on Lola, causing Lola to quit. After arriving in Milan with no one to model the boots, Charlie is forced to go onstage and model the boots himself. After he trips and ultimately falls flat on his face, Lola and her posse of drag queens arrive, put on a spectacular runway show, and save the day.

In the film's denouement, Lola headlines her own show and sings a song in honour of the "kinky boots factory" of Northampton. Most of the key workers are in attendance and enjoying themselves, including Charlie and Lauren, who have become a couple.

Cast

Background
An episode of BBC2 documentary series Trouble at the Top, broadcast on 24 February 1999, inspired the film. The former featured Steve Pateman struggling with possible closure of W.J. Brooks Ltd, a family-controlled Earls Barton, Northamptonshire shoe factory, that soon catered to the market of men wearing traditionally women's shoes, such as black patent boots, under the "Divine" brand. Many of the film's scenes were filmed in the factory used by Tricker's in Northampton.

It is mentioned in management as an example of agility and customer centricity.

Soundtrack
The Kinky Boots: Original Soundtrack was released on April 11, 2006 by Hollywood Records.
 "Whatever Lola Wants" – Chiwetel Ejiofor (2:12)
 "In These Shoes" – Kirsty MacColl (3:39)
 "I Want to Be Evil" – Chiwetel Ejiofor (2:34)
 "Mr. Big Stuff" – Lyn Collins (4:00)
 "It's a Man's Man's Man's World" – James Brown (3:17)
 "I Put a Spell on You" – Nina Simone (2:36)
 "The Prettiest Star" – David Bowie (3:09)
 "Together We Are Beautiful" – Chiwetel Ejiofor (4:10)
 "Yes Sir I Can Boogie" – Chiwetel Ejiofor (4:20)
 "Wild Is the Wind" – Nina Simone (6:59)
 "The Red Shoes" – Adrian Johnston (4:26)
 "Steel Shank" – Adrian Johnston (3:39)
 "Free to Walk" – Adrian Johnston (3:39)

The following songs are included in the film but are not on the Original Soundtrack:
 “My Heart Belongs to Daddy" – Chiwetel Ejiofor
 “These Boots Are Made for Walkin'” – Chiwetel Ejiofor
 "Summer Holiday" – Jemima Rooper

Release

Critical response  
The film received mixed reviews on release, with critics decrying the "formulaic Britcom plot". On the review aggregator website Rotten Tomatoes, the film holds an approval rating of 58% based on 113 reviews, with a weighted average score of 5.8/10. The website's critics consensus reads: "Kinky Boots relies heavily on the Full Monty formula of Britcoms, while playing it too safe in a desperate attempt not to offend. Ejiofor's performance is its redeeming virtue."

Box office
The film earned a total of $9,941,428 internationally.

Awards
Ejiofor was nominated for a Golden Globe Award for Best Actor – Motion Picture Musical or Comedy.

Musical adaptation
A stage musical adaptation debuted on Broadway in April 2013, following an out-of-town try-out at the Bank of America Theatre in Chicago. The songs were composed by Cyndi Lauper, and the book co-written by Harvey Fierstein, director Jerry Mitchell was also the choreographer. The Chicago cast included eventual Broadway cast members Billy Porter and Stark Sands. At the 67th Tony Awards (2013), the Broadway production won six Tony Awards, including Best Original Score (Lauper, first sole female winner), Best Actor (Porter) and Best Musical.

See also
 Cross-dressing in film and television
 Transvestism

References

External links
 
 
 
 
 The differences from the film and real-life

2005 films
2005 comedy-drama films
2000s business films
American comedy-drama films
American LGBT-related films
British comedy-drama films
British LGBT-related films
LGBT-related films based on actual events
Films set in Northamptonshire
Films shot in England
LGBT-related comedy-drama films
Films directed by Julian Jarrold
Films shot at Pinewood Studios
Films set in factories
BBC Film films
2005 comedy films
2005 drama films
Drag (clothing)-related films
2005 LGBT-related films
2000s English-language films
2000s American films
2000s British films